Zara Long (born 6 November 1970) is a retired British swimmer.

Swimming career
Long competed at the 1984 Summer Olympics and the 1988 Summer Olympics. She represented England and won two silver medals in the 4 x 100 metres and 4 x 200 metres freestyle relays, at the 1986 Commonwealth Games in Edinburgh, Scotland. Four years later she represented England and won a bronze medal in the 4 x 100 metres freestyle relay, at the 1990 Commonwealth Games in Auckland, New Zealand. She also won the 1987 ASA National British Championships in the 100 metres freestyle and was five times 200 metres medley champion in 1985, 1986, 1987, 1990 and 1991 and twice 400 metres medley champion in 1990 and 1991.

References

External links
 

1970 births
Living people
British female swimmers
Olympic swimmers of Great Britain
Swimmers at the 1984 Summer Olympics
Swimmers at the 1988 Summer Olympics
People from Dulwich
Sportspeople from London
Commonwealth Games medallists in swimming
Commonwealth Games silver medallists for England
Commonwealth Games bronze medallists for England
Swimmers at the 1986 Commonwealth Games
Swimmers at the 1990 Commonwealth Games
Medallists at the 1986 Commonwealth Games
Medallists at the 1990 Commonwealth Games